Rahel Marianne Kiwic (born 5 January 1991) is a retired Swiss football defender who last played for FC Zürich in the Swiss Nationalliga A. In March 2012 she made her debut for the Swiss national team in the 2012 Cyprus Women's Cup. As a junior international she took part in the 2010 U-20 World Cup.

References

External links

1991 births
Living people
MSV Duisburg (women) players
Swiss women's footballers
Switzerland women's international footballers
Expatriate women's footballers in Germany
Swiss expatriate sportspeople in Germany
Women's association football defenders
Frauen-Bundesliga players
FC Zürich Frauen players
Swiss Women's Super League players
1. FFC Turbine Potsdam players
2015 FIFA Women's World Cup players
Footballers from Zürich
UEFA Women's Euro 2022 players
UEFA Women's Euro 2017 players
Swiss expatriate women's footballers
21st-century Swiss women